Chiuduno is a comune (municipality) in the Province of Bergamo, in Italian region of Lombardy; Chiuduno is located about  northeast of Milan and about  southeast of Bergamo, midway between the Bergamo plain and the Valcalepio.

Chiuduno borders the following municipalities: Bolgare, Carobbio degli Angeli, Grumello del Monte, Telgate.

History
The settlement has Gaulish origins, and was later a Roman centre as Claudunum on the road between Bergamo and Brescia. It is however mentioned for the first time in a document from 795, and in the Middle Ages it developed and received a fortress.

Main sights
Castle (9th century), of which only a tower and other parts remain.
Another fortification on the border with the territory of Carobbio degli Angeli (now Suardi villa, 17th century).

Demographic evolution

References